The Women's 500 m time trial competition at the 2021 UCI Track Cycling World Championships was held on 23 October 2021.

Results

Qualifying
The Qualifyingwas started 10:46. The top eight riders qualified for the final.

Final
The final was started at 17:30.

References

Women's 500 m time trial